Ngwe (Ŋwɛh, Nweh) is a Bamileke language spoken predominantly in Lebialem, Cameroon. As of 2001, Ngwe had 73,200 speakers, which was an increase from the numbers of previous censuses. Its closest relatives are Yemba and Ngiemboon.

Writing system

Phonology

Vowels 
It has at least thirteen vowels, . /ɤ ʌ/ are centralised. /y/ sounds somewhat like [ø] or [œ] and has a tongue position similar to that of /ɑ/, but with the jaw raised and the lips very close together.

References

External links
Ayotte, Michael & Ayotte, Charlene. 2002. "Sociolinguistic Language Survey of Ngwe." SIL International

Languages of Cameroon
Bamileke languages